Frej Lindqvist (born 13 October 1937) is a Swedish actor. He has appeared in more than 50 films and television shows since 1961.

Early life
Lindqvist, who is a Swedish-speaking Finn, was born in Helsinki, Finland. During World War II, he was sent to Luleå, Sweden, as a Finnish war child. Lindqvist studied philosophy and literary history at Lund University before moving back to Helsinki where he studied at Svenska Teaterns elevskola from 1958 to 1960. He moved back to Sweden in 1964.

Selected filmography
 Woman of Darkness (1966)
 A Handful of Love (1974)
 I Am Maria (1979)

References

External links

1937 births
Living people
20th-century Swedish male actors
21st-century Swedish male actors
Swedish male film actors
Swedish male television actors
Male actors from Helsinki
Finnish emigrants to Sweden
Finnish refugees
Naturalized citizens of Sweden
Refugees in Sweden
Swedish people of Finnish descent
Swedish-speaking Finns